Arnaboldi may refer to:

People
Andrea Arnaboldi (born 1987), Italian tennis player
Letizia Brichetto-Arnaboldi (born 1949), Italian businesswoman and former politician

Places
Albaredo Arnaboldi, comune in Italy